Duncan Grob (born 18 August 1980) is a Chilean alpine skier. He competed at the 2002 Winter Olympics and the 2006 Winter Olympics.

References

External links
 

1980 births
Living people
Chilean male alpine skiers
Olympic alpine skiers of Chile
Alpine skiers at the 2002 Winter Olympics
Alpine skiers at the 2006 Winter Olympics
People from Osorno, Chile
21st-century Chilean people